In Paradise (Swedish: I paradis...) is a 1941 Swedish comedy film directed by Per Lindberg and starring Margit Manstad, Viveca Lindfors and Georg Rydeberg. It was shot at the Centrumateljéerna Studios in Stockholm. The film's sets were designed by the art director Bertil Duroj.

Synopsis
A handsome publisher has developed a reputation as a Don Juan and he is hounded by women under this misapprehension. To escape from them he travels out to an isolated island.

Cast
 Einar Beyron as 	Adam Tomson
 Margit Manstad as Birgitta Vendel
 Viveca Lindfors as 	Angelica Jansson
 Birgitta Valberg as	Marianne 
 Georg Rydeberg as 	Leo Flykt
 Anna-Lisa Baude as Aunt Augusta
 Fritiof Billquist as 	Oscar
 Gudrun Brost as 	Klara
 Hilding Gavle as 	'Blixten'
 Nils Lundell as 	Lasse
 Nils Ohlin as 	Bernhard
 Harry Roeck Hansen as 	Jansson

References

Bibliography 
 Qvist, Per Olov & von Bagh, Peter. Guide to the Cinema of Sweden and Finland. Greenwood Publishing Group, 2000.

External links 
 

1941 films
Swedish comedy films
1941 comedy films
1940s Swedish-language films
Films directed by Per Lindberg
Swedish black-and-white films
1940s Swedish films